Kwong Wa (born Chan Muk-wah on 19 November 1961) is a Hong Kong actor and singer. He is known for his portrayals of Chinese historical characters such as Lao Ai (A Step into the Past), Xiang Yu (The Conqueror's Story), Tang Sanzang (Journey to the West), Emperor Xuanzong of Tang (The Legend of Lady Yang), Yongzheng Emperor (The King of Yesterday and Tomorrow), and Qianlong Emperor (Happy Ever After).

Career
Chan had his acting debut in the 1989 film Life Goes On as a cancer patient, which won him the Best New Actor Award in the 9th Hong Kong Film Awards. He then gained wider fame as Tang Sanzang in the television series Journey to the West (1996) and its sequel Journey to the West II (1998). After appearing in other dramas such as The Legend of Lady Yang (1999), Crimson Sabre (2001), and A Step into the Past (2001), Chan reached the peak of his fame as the Yongzheng Emperor in 2003's The King of Yesterday and Tomorrow. The show gained extremely high ratings and Chan was acclaimed for his charismatic performance as the emperor who travelled through time to 21st century Hong Kong. Afterwards, he has appeared in The Conqueror's Story (2004).

Personal life
During a 2018 interview, Chan stated that he had suffered an accident that rendered him with a temporarily paralysed foot. Not knowing whether or not he would recover, let alone ever walk, he found consolation through Christianity and, during this time, made his conversion.

Filmography

Film

Television

Awards

References

Notes

External links
 IMDb entry
 HKMDB entry

1961 births
Living people
Hong Kong male singers
TVB actors
20th-century Hong Kong male actors
21st-century Hong Kong male actors
Hong Kong male television actors
Hong Kong male film actors